Piet Bakers (5 September 1922 – 14 August 1998) was a Dutch footballer. He played in one match for the Netherlands national football team in 1951.

References

External links
 

1922 births
1998 deaths
Dutch footballers
Netherlands international footballers
Association football defenders
PSV Eindhoven players
ADO Den Haag players
RKSV Nuenen players
Footballers from Eindhoven